Team Yankee is a computer wargame adaptation of the 1987 Harold Coyle's World War III novel Team Yankee that was developed by British studio Oxford Digital Enterprises for Amiga, Atari ST, MS-DOS, and Commodore CDTV. It was published in 1990 by Empire Software, Team Yankee is a mixture of real-time strategy and simulation game with a 3D environment and 2D sprites.  The player is able to use several well-known late Cold War-era tanks and other armoured vehicles (M1 Abrams, M2 Bradley IFV, M113, T-72, T-62 and BMP-2).

Two sequels followed: Pacific Islands and War in the Gulf.

Gameplay

Reception
1992 and 1994 Computer Gaming World surveys of wargames with modern settings gave the game two stars out of five, describing it as "an arcade-like product trying to pass as a simulation of modern tactical armored warfare". A full review by the magazine in 1992 criticized Team Yankees lack of infantry (making the machines guns useless) or air power (despite the aircraft on the box art). The magazine concluded that it, while more realistic than Pacific Islands, was not for "the hard-core wargamer, but are for people who enjoy a quick and relatively easy run-through of a tank game".

References

External links
 Team Yankee at Amiga Hall of Light
 Team Yankee at Atari Mania

1987 video games
Amiga games
Atari ST games
Cold War video games
Commodore CDTV games
Computer wargames
DOS games
Military combat simulators
Tank simulation video games
Video games based on novels
Video games developed in the United Kingdom
World War III video games
Empire Interactive games